The Return of Boston Blackie is a 1927 low-budget, silent, drama genre film starring Bob Custer. Based upon a character created by Jack Boyle for short stories appearing in The American, Cosmopolitan and Redbook magazines in the 1900s. It was directed by Harry O. Hoyt and written by Leah Baird. 
The character also appeared in another silent film in 1918, Boston Blackie's Little Pal, played by five different actors, including Lionel Barrymore.

The story
Just out of jail and vowing to go straight, former jewel thief Boston Blackie undertakes the reformation of a pretty blonde who has stolen a necklace from a cabaret dancer. He learns that the jewel belongs to the mother of the blonde girl, and the blonde's philandering father gave it as a gift to the cabaret girl. Blackie must find a way to return the necklace to the owner's safe without arousing the suspicions of the girl's family.

Cast
 Corliss Palmer		
 Bob Custer (as Raymond Glenn)
 Rosemary Cooper		
 Coit Albertson		
 William Worthington		
 Florence Wix		
 J.P. Lockney		
 Violet Palmer		
 Strongheart

External links
"The Return of Boston Blackie"

allmovie/synopsis

1927 films
American silent feature films
American black-and-white films
1927 crime drama films
American crime drama films
Boston Blackie films
1920s American films
Silent American drama films
1920s English-language films